Scalectrix is the debut EP by Australian post-grunge band, Gyroscope, and was released in April 2000. The five-track EP was recorded at Revolver Studios in Perth and engineered by Laurie Sinagra and Gav Tempany. This release helped the band secure support spots with national and international touring acts, including Millencolin, Bodyjar, 28 Days, Unwritten Law and Toe To Toe.

Track listing

References

2000 EPs
Gyroscope (band) albums